The 1974 English cricket season was the 75th in which the County Championship had been an official competition. The recent pattern of joint tours continued with India and Pakistan again playing three Tests each against England. Worcestershire won the County Championship.

Honours
County Championship - Worcestershire
Gillette Cup - Kent
Sunday League - Leicestershire
Benson & Hedges Cup - Surrey
Minor Counties Championship - Oxfordshire
Second XI Championship - Middlesex II 
Wisden - Dennis Amiss, Mike Denness, Norman Gifford, Tony Greig, Andy Roberts

Test series

County Championship

Gillette Cup

Benson & Hedges Cup

Sunday League

Leading batsmen

Leading bowlers

References

Annual reviews
 Playfair Cricket Annual 1975
 Wisden Cricketers' Almanack 1975

External links
 CricketArchive – season and tournament itineraries

1974 in English cricket
English cricket seasons in the 20th century